Jaap is a Dutch given name that is short for Jacob or Jacobus (Jacob or James in English). People with this name include:

Academics
Jaap R. Bruijn (born 1938), Dutch maritime historian
Jaap Doek (born 1942), Dutch jurist
Jaap van Ginneken (born 1943), Dutch psychologist and communication scholar
Jaap Goudsmit (born 1951), Dutch HIV/AIDS researcher
 (born 1925), Dutch archaeologist
Jaap van den Herik (born 1947), Dutch computer scientist
Jaap van der Hoeden (1891–1968), Dutch and Israeli veterinary research scientist
 (1917–2010), Dutch nuclear physicist 
Jaap Korevaar (born 1923), Dutch mathematician
Jaap Kruithof (1929–2009), Belgian philosopher and writer
Jaap Kunst (1891–1960), Dutch ethnomusicologist
Jaap Mansfeld (born 1936), Dutch philosopher and historian
Jaap Murre (born 1929), Dutch mathematician
Jaap van Praag (1911–1981), Dutch humanist
Jaap Schekkerman (born 1953), Dutch computer scientist
 (born 1959), Dutch paleontologist
Jaap van der Vecht (1906–1992), Dutch entomologist
Jaap van Velsen (1921–1990), Dutch-born British anthropologist
Jaap J. Vermeulen (born 1955), Dutch botanist
Jaap Wessels (1939–2009), Dutch mathematician
Jaap de Wilde (born 1957), Dutch international relations scholar
Jaap de Zwaan (born 1949), Dutch lawyer and legal scholar

Arts
Jaap Bakema (1914–1981), Dutch modernist architect
Jaap Berghuis (1945–2005), Dutch artist
Jaap Blonk (born 1953), Dutch avant-garde composer and performance artist
Jaap Drupsteen (born 1942), Dutch graphic designer
Jaap Eggermont (born 1946), Dutch record producer
Jaap Flier (born 1934), Dutch dancer and choreographer
Jaap Gestman Geradts (born 1951), Dutch pin-up artist
Jaap Klinkhamer (1854–1928), Dutch architect
Jaap Lamberton, Dutch comics artist
Jaap ter Linden (born 1947), Dutch cellist, viol player and conductor
Jaap Reesema (born 1984), Dutch singer
Jaap Schreurs (1913–1983), Dutch painter and graphic artist
Jaap Schröder (1925–2020), Dutch violinist, conductor, and pedagogue
Jaap Spaanderman (1896–1985), Dutch pianist, cellist, and conductor
Jaap Speyer (1891–1952), Dutch film director
Jaap Stotijn (1891–1970), Dutch oboist
Jaap Valkhoff (1910–1992), Dutch musician, composer and lyricist
Jaap Vegter (1932–2003), Dutch cartoonist
Jaap van Zweden (born 1960), Dutch violinist and conductor

Politics
Jaap van Amerongen (1913–1995), Dutch-Israeli economist and government official 
Jaap Boersma (1929–2012), Dutch Minister of Social Affairs
Jaap Burger (1904–1986), Dutch Minister of the Interior
Jaap de Hoop Scheffer (born 1948), Dutch Secretary General of NATO
Jaap Marais (1922–2000), Afrikaner nationalist thinker, author and politician
Jaap Metz (1941–2016), Dutch journalist and politician
Jaap Oldenbroek (1897–1970), Dutch trade union leader and politician
Jaap Pop (born 1941), Dutch mayor of Franeker, Tiel, Alkmaar and Haarlem
Jaap Schrieke (1884–1976), Dutch jurist and administrator during WWII
Jaap Smit (born 1957), Dutch preacher and trade unionist

Sports
Jaap Barendregt (1905–1952), Dutch footballer
Jaap Beije (1927–2013), Dutch rower
Jaap Boot (1903–1986), Dutch sprinter and long jumper
Jaap Bulder (1896–1979), Dutch footballer
Jaap-Derk Buma (born 1972), Dutch field hockey player
Jaap Davids (born 1984), Dutch footballer
Jaap van Dorp (born 1990), Dutch curler
Jaap van Duijn (born 1990), Dutch footballer
Jaap Eden (1873–1925), Dutch speed skater and racing cyclist
The Jaap Eden Award, Jaap Eden baan and Jaap Edenhal are named after him
Jaap Enters (born 1939), Dutch rower
Jaap Havekotte (1912–2014), Dutch speed skater
Jaap Helder (1907–1998), Dutch sports sailor
Jaap Kersten (born 1934), Dutch racing cyclist
Jaap ten Kortenaar (born 1964), Dutch racing cyclist
Jaap Knol (1896–1975), Dutch javelin thrower
Jaap Kraaier (1913–2004), Dutch canoeist
Jaap Krijtenburg (born 1969), Dutch rower
Jaap van Lagen (born 1976), Dutch racing driver
Jaap van der Leck (1911–2000), Dutch football manager
Jaap Leemhuis (1941–2014), Dutch field hockey player
Jaap Meijer (1905–1943), Dutch track cyclist
Jaap Mol (1912–1972), Dutch footballer
Jaap Oudkerk (born 1937), Dutch track cyclist
Jaap van der Poll (1914–2010), Dutch javelin thrower
Jaap van Praag (1910–1987), Dutch football administrator, chairman of Ajax
Jaap Reesink (born 1946), Dutch rower
Jaap Rijks (1919–2017), Dutch equestrian
Jaap Schouten (born 1984), Dutch rower
Jaap Sjouwerman (1891–1964), Dutch wrestler
Jaap Stam (born 1972), Dutch football player and manager
Jaap Stenger (1907–1992), Dutch rower
Jaap Stockmann (born 1984), Dutch field hockey goalkeeper
Jaap Voigt (born 1941), Dutch field hockey player
Jaap Weber (1901–1979), Dutch footballer
Jaap de Zeeuw (born 1954), Dutch sports sailor
Jaap Zielhuis (born 1966), Dutch sports sailor

Writers
Jaap ter Haar (1922–1998), Dutch writer of children's books and historian 
Jaap Nunes Vaz (1906–1943), Dutch journalist, writer, and editor

Other
Jaap Amesz (born 1982), Dutch television personality
Jaap Blokker (1942–2011), Dutch businessman and executive
Jaap Haartsen (born 1963), Dutch electrical engineer and inventor of Bluetooth
 (1923–1997), Dutch television journalist and presenter
Jaap Penraat (1918–2006), Dutch resistance fighter during World War II
Jaap Staal (1913–1981), Dutch commando during World War II
Jaap Veldhuyzen van Zanten (1927–1977), Dutch aircraft captain and flight instructor
Jaap Weideman (1936–1996), South African Navy officer

See also
 Jaap Sahib, Sikh prayer 

Dutch masculine given names

de:Jaap
ja:ヤープ